Lee Jeong-eun (or  ; born 13 September 1994) is a professional female racewalker from South Korea. She competed in the Women's 20 kilometres walk event at the 2015 World Championships in Athletics in Beijing, China.

References

External links

South Korean female racewalkers
Living people
Place of birth missing (living people)
1994 births
World Athletics Championships athletes for South Korea
Athletes (track and field) at the 2016 Summer Olympics
Athletes (track and field) at the 2018 Asian Games
Olympic athletes of South Korea
Asian Games competitors for South Korea
21st-century South Korean women